Buffalo Island is a local name given to western Mississippi County and eastern Craighead County, Arkansas. It consists of the land south of Big Lake between the Little River (not to be confused with a stream of the same name in southwestern Arkansas) and the St. Francis River, containing the communities of Manila (Mississippi County), Monette (Craighead County), Leachville (Mississippi County), Black Oak (Craighead County), and Caraway (Craighead County)."

Towns & cities 

 Arkansas 
Black Oak 
Caraway 
Leachville (Mississippi Co.)  
Manila (Mississippi Co.) 
Monette.

Unincorporated communities 
In addition to the incorporated towns and cities in Buffalo Island; there are many unincorporated areas that are often overlooked by persons who do not know the area.
I have listed many of these unincorporated Buffalo Island communities.

 Within Craighead County, AR 
Cane Island 
Carmi 
Cottonwood Corner 
Childress 
Degelow 
Delfore 
Garson 
Hancock Junction 
Lennie 
Macey 
Mangrum 
Poplar Ridge 
Red Onion 
Rokey  
Springfield 
Walters 
Whisp

 Within Mississippi County, AR 
Buckeye 
Clearwater 
Mandalay 
Milligan Ridge 
Pawheen 
Vail 
Walters

The cities of Leachville & Monette are home to the Buffalo Island Central School District. Which is often referred to as "Buffalo Island Central" or "BIC".

Sri Lanka 
 Bufalo Island, Sri Lanka — island of Sri Lanka

References 

Geography of Arkansas
Geography of Mississippi